Arrow SNC was an Italian aircraft engine manufacturer based in Piacenza. The company specialized in the design and manufacture of two-stroke engines for ultralight and homebuilt aircraft. The company is no longer in business.

The company developed a series of engines that were of a modular design, with the same pistons, cylinders and gearboxes, but using different crankcases. These were assembled into single, twin and four-cylinder engines named for their displacements in cubic centimetres.

At one time the company did have a North American distributor in Montreal, Quebec, Canada.

Engines

References

Defunct aircraft engine manufacturers of Italy
Ultralight aircraft
Homebuilt aircraft